Of Arena is an indoor multi-purpose sports venue located in Of town of Trabzon Province, Turkey. The arena has a capacity of 1,000 spectators.

It hosted the judo events during the 2011 European Youth Summer Olympic Festival.

References

Sports venues in Trabzon
Volleyball venues in Turkey
Handball venues in Turkey
Basketball venues in Turkey